Nunc dimittis is a canticle from the New Testament. The canticle was often translated and set to music. Nunc dimittis and related translations may also refer to:


Music

Latin 
 Nunc dimittis (Pärt), a setting by Arvo Pärt (2001)

English 
 List of English settings of Magnificats and Nunc dimittis, which includes
 Magnificat and Nunc dimittis in D (Wood), a setting by Charles Wood (1898)
 Magnificat and Nunc dimittis (Gloucester), a setting by Herbert Howells for Gloucester Cathedral (1947)
 Magnificat and Nunc dimittis for St Paul's Cathedral, a setting by Herbert Howells for St Paul's Cathedral (1950)

German 
 "Mit Fried und Freud ich fahr dahin", a hymn by Martin Luther (1524), on which several works are based, including
 Mit Fried und Freud (Buxtehude), a funeral cantata by Dieterich Buxtehude (1674)
 Mit Fried und Freud ich fahr dahin, BWV 125, a cantata for the feast of the Purification by Johann Sebastian Bach (1723)

Other 
 "Nunc Dimittis" (short story), a short story by Robert Dahl (1953)